Rio Creek is an unincorporated community located off Wisconsin Highway 54 in the towns of Casco and Lincoln, in Kewaunee County, Wisconsin. The community is home to Rio Creek Airport (WI28) which holds an annual "fly in" with food, camping, and live music.

References

Unincorporated communities in Wisconsin
Unincorporated communities in Kewaunee County, Wisconsin